The Citadel Bulldogs basketball teams represented The Citadel, The Military College of South Carolina in Charleston, South Carolina, United States.  The program was established in 1900–01, and has continuously fielded a team since 1912–13.  Their primary rivals are College of Charleston, Furman and VMI.

1999–2000

|-
|colspan=7 align=center|2000 Southern Conference men's basketball tournament

2000–01

|-
|colspan=7 align=center|2001 Southern Conference men's basketball tournament

2001–02

2002–03

|-
|colspan=7 align=center|2003 Southern Conference men's basketball tournament

2003–04

|-
|colspan=7 align=center|2004 Southern Conference men's basketball tournament

2004–05

|-
|colspan=7 align=center|2005 Southern Conference men's basketball tournament

2005–06

|-
|colspan=7 align=center|2006 Southern Conference men's basketball tournament

2006–07

|-
|colspan=7 align=center|2007 Southern Conference men's basketball tournament

2007–08

|-
| colspan=7 align=center|2008 Southern Conference men's basketball tournament

2008–09

References
 
 
 
 
 
 
 
 
 
 
 

The Citadel Bulldogs basketball seasons